Minuscule 708 (in the Gregory-Aland numbering), ε153 (von Soden), is a Greek minuscule manuscript of the New Testament, on parchment. Palaeographically it has been assigned to the 11th century. The manuscript is lacunose. Scrivener labelled it as 607e.

Description 

The codex contains the text of the four Gospels on 200 parchment leaves (size ), 
with one lacuna in text (Matthew 20:15-24:22).

The text is written in one column per page, 30 lines per page. It has ornamental headpieces.

It contains portraits of the Evangelists (Mark as eagle, John as lion).

Text 

The Greek text of the codex is a representative of the Byzantine text-type. Kurt Aland placed it in Category V.

According to the Claremont Profile Method it represents mixed Byzantine text in Luke 1 and textual family Kx in Luke 20. In Luke 10 no profile was made.

History 

Scrivener and Gregory dated the manuscript to the 11th century. Currently the manuscript is dated by the INTF to the 11th century.

The manuscript was held n Constantinople, where was bought in 1882.

It was added to the list of New Testament manuscripts by Scrivener (607) and Gregory (708). Gregory saw the manuscript in 1883.

At present the manuscript is housed at the Bodleian Library (MS. Auct. T. inf. 1. 3) in Oxford.

See also 

 List of New Testament minuscules
 Biblical manuscript
 Textual criticism

References

Further reading 
 Kurt Weitzmann & George Galavaris, The Monastery of Saint Catherine at Mount Sinai. The illuminated Greek manuscripts, vol. I: From the  ninth to the twelfth century, Princeton, New Jersey: Princeton University Press, 1990, p. 81 n. 2

External links 
 MSS. Auctarium at the Bodleian Library

Greek New Testament minuscules
11th-century biblical manuscripts
Bodleian Library collection